Zarraffa's Coffee is a national coffee house chain located primarily in Queensland, Australia and with franchises in Western Australia and New South Wales.

History
Zarraffa's Coffee, established in 1996 by Kenton Campbell, was originally a roasting house operating from the backstreets of Southport on the Gold Coast. It opened its first store on the Gold Coast with three tables and nine chairs in 1996.  

By 2009 the company had 40 stores, including a second Drive Thru in Toowoomba and a Central Queensland store at Rockhampton. Also in 2009 Kenton Campbell launched a non-profit charitable foundation established to address environmental and conservation issues.

By August, 2018, Zarraffa's Coffee has opened its 50th Drive Thru store, and its 85th store in Australia. A new company headquarters was established at Eagleby, QLD in late 2018.

In November 2020, Zarraffa's launched Sugar Creek Smokehouse, an Australian-Texan BBQ fusion.

Awards
In 2007 and 2008, Zarraffa's Coffee received the Gold Coast Business of the Year award.
Gold Coast Business Excellence Awards 2008 – Retail, Wholesale and Distribution Category Winner
Gold Coast Young Entrepreneur of the Year 2008 – Kenton Campbell, Managing Director
2011 Australian Business Award for ‘Enterprise’

See also

 List of coffeehouse chains
 List of restaurant chains in Australia

References

Coffeehouses and cafés in Australia
Companies based on the Gold Coast, Queensland
Australian companies established in 1996
Restaurants established in 1996